Zygophyllum dumosum (syn. Tetraena dumosa), the bushy bean-caper, is a species of flowering plant in the family Zygophyllaceae, native to Egypt, the Sinai Peninsula, and the Levant. It is a dominant shrub in the highlands of the Negev Desert.

References

dumosum
Flora of Egypt
Flora of Sinai
Flora of Palestine (region)
Flora of Lebanon
Plants described in 1849